Lankelapalem is a neighbourhood in the city of Visakhapatnam, state of Andhra Pradesh, India. It is a suburb of the city.

About
It is on the south side of city with many small scale industries situated here including pharma city, employing many locals, and it is one of the transport hub.

Transport
Lankelapalem is well connected with Gajuwaka, NAD X Road, Malkapuram and Dwaraka Nagar.

APSRTC routes

References

Neighbourhoods in Visakhapatnam